Stopan is a village in the Bosnia and Herzegovina, Kotor Varoš Municipality, Šiprage local community. At the census in 1991, Stopan  had a population of 346. According to preliminary results of the census 2013 there were 119 citizens.

Geography 
Stopan is located on the pass (altitude about 680 m) sandwiched between Crkvenica and Stopanski river, right tributaries of Vrbanja river. From this village to Šiprage there is a mostly gravel local road, length of about 8 km.

Stopan used to be a relatively big village in Šiprage's area, with drinking water and orchards, domestic fruit products and hospitality.

History
During World War II, the village took part in the defense forces and was a significant partisan jump refuge. In January 1944, it received a large number of wounded partisans, who were evacuated from the Divisional Hospital in the gorge of Demićka, near  Šiprage, during the sixth enemy offensive. Because of the distance of the main local communications, Stopan was a safer refuge for the civilian inhabitants of surrounding localities.

During the War in Bosnia (1992-1995), army, police and paramilitary forces of the Republika Srpska destroyed the surrounding Bosniak villages, especially those upstream of Vrbanja to Kruševo Brdo as well as those downstream to Banja Luka. Local inhabitants were being killed, and the majority were expelled. After 1996, most Bosniak villages in Šiprage community were partly restored, thanks to the BELUGA battalion of the EUFOR-SFOR Mission. The only mosque in the wide area was renewed.

Population

References 

Populated places in Bosnia and Herzegovina
Populated places in Kotor Varoš